Pandit Suman Ghosh is an internationally acclaimed Hindustani Classical Vocalist of the Mewati Gharana of Hindustani Classical Music and a torch-bearing disciple of Sangeet Martand Pandit Jasraj. He is the founder and President of the Center for Indian Classical Music of Houston (CICMH).

Early life
Pandit Suman Ghosh was born on 6 January 1967 to Smt. Monica Ghosh and Shri Biman Krishna Ghosh. Pandit Ghosh started his musical education under the guidance of his mother and unequivocal support of his father. Pandit Suman Ghosh continued his formal training, first under Maestro Pandit Shrikant Bakre, a torch-bearer of the great Ustad Amir Khan. Then, he was groomed by Padma Bhushan Pandit Jnan Prakash Ghosh for several years. Finally, Pandit Suman Ghosh underwent several years of intense training on and off stage, with the living legend, Padma Vibhushan Sangeet Martand Pandit Jasraj.

Besides pursuing music, he has earned a Bachelor's and a master's degree from University of Calcutta.

Career
Pandit Suman Ghosh, is a performer of note and is also committed to the cause of spreading Hindustani Classical Music and its rich and age-old tradition not only in India, but throughout the world. His vision is to enrich every individual by musically awakening their inner spiritual self. He has dedicated the past 30 years of his life to selflessly serving the global human community through his performances and spreading this tradition through his teachings, thus promoting and cultivating this beautiful art in particular and Indian Culture as a whole.

The Performer

Pandit Suman Ghosh gave his first full concert at the age of 12. He soon became one of the youngest ever artists in All India Radio to perform in three different genres.

As an established musician, he performs regularly all over the United States, Canada, Europe and India. In India, he has performed in several prestigious events like Pandit Motiram Pandit Maniram Sangeet Samaroh, Saptak Annual Festival of Music and the Malhar Festival. He has also had the privilege of singing before Dr. A P J Abdul Kalam, former President of India, both at Rashtrapati Bhavan in 2000 and during Dr. Kalam's visit to USA in 2011.

The Guru

Pandit Suman Ghosh combines academics and performance with ease. He has done research in ethnomusicology funded by many European and American organizations and has given several lectures on the complex art of the Indian Classical Music System. He was the only music scholar from India to have been invited to present his research at the conference organized by International Association of Sound and Audiovisual Archives (IASA) in Vienna, Austria in 1999, in celebration of 100 years of Sound Archiving.

In addition to being a performer, Pandit Ghosh has a vision to spread not only this art in its purest form, but also other aspects of the Indian Culture, traditions and ethos as well, making it accessible to all, far and beyond the Indian Sub-Continent. As a necessary step towards this goal, he founded Center for Indian Classical Music of Houston (CICMH), Houston, USA, 2008.

The Consulate General of India hosted a reception in his honor in 2016 to recognize his contributions as a true ambassador of Indian Culture. He has also earned a Lifetime Achievement Award from the North American Bengali Conference in 2015.

Awards and Recognitions 
2016 - Reception by the Honorable Consul General of India in recognition of his work as a true Ambassador of Indian Culture

2015

- LIFETIME ACHIEVEMENT AWARD, NABC (35th North American Bengali Conf), July 2015

-"A Night of Musical Bliss", Times Of India,

2014 -"Virtuoso performer"  Concert Review, Times of India

2011 - Proclamation from the Office of the Mayor of City of Sugar Land for Pt. Ghosh’s ‘tireless efforts and motivation on preserving and keeping the ancient Indian tradition alive for present and future generations’

2010 - Tagore Award, India Culture Center of Houston and the Indian Consulate

2008 -Acharya Varishtha, bestowed by Padma Vibhushan Pandit Jasraj, 2008

2005 -Gold Medal of Excellence for the MUSICAL SCORING, Hollywood Film ‘Dancing in Twilight’ Park City Film Music Festival

References

 Homage for a Guru , IAN, 2016

http://www.indoamerican-news.com/moods-of-%E2%80%9Cashta-prahar%E2%80%9D-musically-unfolded-by-cicmh/

http://www.indoamerican-news.com/on-mission-on-target-india-house-gala-celebrates-a-busy-year/

http://www.indoamerican-news.com/houston-rath-yatra-2015-a-unique-spiritual-experience/

http://www.indoamerican-news.com/houston-chariot-festival-shree-jagannath-rath-yatra-2015/

http://www.indoamerican-news.com/indias-flag-flutters-in-morning-breeze-goals-unveiled-in-evening-reception/

http://www.indoamerican-news.com/sri-durga-puja-at-vedanta-society-of-greater-houston-brings-in-devotees-despite-the-rain/

http://www.indoamerican-news.com/confluence-by-tsh-leaves-the-audience-spellbound/

http://www.indoamerican-news.com/lord-krishna-janmashtami-at-iskcon-of-houston/

http://www.indoamerican-news.com/republic-day-reception-by-indian-consulate-introduces-new-ambassador/

http://www.indoamerican-news.com/sweet-srimad-bhagavatam-showers-drench-listeners-from-houston-and-around-usa/

http://www.indoamerican-news.com/pandit-jasraj-vocal-concert-an-epitome-of-musical-spirituality/

http://www.indoamerican-news.com/consular-reception-for-the-republic-hits-high-notes-for-culture/

http://www.indoamerican-news.com/classical-concert-reaches-spiritual-heights/

http://www.indoamerican-news.com/north-south-a-jugalbandi-to-remember/

http://www.indoamerican-news.com/iaccgh-gala-shows-strides-south-asian-businesses-have-made-during-last-decade/

http://www.indoamerican-news.com/devotees-enthralled-by-houston-area-artists/

http://www.indoamerican-news.com/indian-artists-perform-at-rice-radio%E2%80%99s-21st-annual-outdoor-show/

External links
 Official site

Hindustani singers
Living people
Mewati gharana
1967 births
Place of birth missing (living people)